Sidney Charles Cooke (born 18 April 1927) is an English convicted child molester and suspected serial killer serving two life sentences. He was the leader of a paedophile ring suspected of murdering up to twenty young boys in the 1970s and 1980s. Cooke and other members of the ring were convicted of three killings in total, although he was only convicted of one himself.

Cooke is suspected by police of killing the three boys with the ring; he was named by gang member Leslie Bailey as the killer of Mark Tildesley in 1984 when Bailey confessed to the murder, and he is also suspected to have been involved in the murder of 6-year-old Barry Lewis which Bailey was also convicted of. Cooke's gang have also been the subject of several investigations into possible links to the disappearances of two boys, Martin Allen and Vishal Mehrotra, who were abducted from London in 1979 and 1981 respectively.

Cooke was nicknamed Hissing Sid by colleagues, and was described by The Guardian newspaper in 1999 as "Britain's most notorious paedophile".

Early life
Cooke was born on 18 April 1927 in Stroud, Gloucestershire. Before enlisting in the British Army in August 1945, Cooke worked as a farm labourer. Cooke was eventually released in 1952 after serving many prison sentences for being away without authorisation. As a soldier, Cooke was deemed to be "unsatisfactory". In the 1960s, Cooke found work as a fairground worker, which made it easy for him to move around the United Kingdom. As part of his system to lure young boys, Cooke set up a child's version of the high striker amusement. Cooke was found guilty in 1961 of sexually abusing a young boy at a movie theatre. Cooke had a reputation as an aggressive pederast who loved corrupting young boys, despite the fact that this would be his sole criminal conviction for a number of years.

"Dirty Dozen"
In the 1970s, Cooke and a group of approximately twelve paedophiles began hiring rent boys and abducting young male children off the streets. The victims were drugged, raped and abused in group orgies. By the mid-1980s, the group had acquired a flat on the Kingsmead housing estate in Hackney, East London.

Gang rape and killing of Jason Swift
In November 1985, a group led by Cooke had each paid £5 to gang rape 14-year-old Jason Swift in what the media described as a homosexual orgy. After Swift's body was found in a shallow grave by a dog walker, an investigation by the Metropolitan Police led to the arrest of Cooke along with three accomplices: Leslie Bailey, Robert Oliver and Steven Barrell. On 12 May 1989, Cooke was sentenced at the Old Bailey to nineteen years in Wandsworth Prison for the manslaughter of Swift. The group were originally charged with murder before all were convicted of manslaughter.

Oliver received a lesser sentence of fifteen years, but was released from prison after eight and changed his name to Karl Curtis. In July 2013, he was jailed for three years after being found guilty of luring children into his home in Maidstone, Kent. This was due to the breach of a court order which banned him from having unsupervised contact with children.

Murder of Mark Tildesley

Bailey and other gang members told authorities that Cooke was among those who murdered Mark Tildesley, a seven-year-old boy, in Wokingham, Berkshire on 1 June 1984. Bailey claimed that Tildesley was lured away from a Wokingham funfair by Cooke on the promise of a 50p bag of sweets. In 1991, the Crown Prosecution Service (CPS) declined to prosecute Cooke for Tildesley's murder as he was already in prison for the manslaughter of Swift. As Bailey was the only one who confessed to Tildesley's murder, the CPS decided to only formally press charges against him for the killing despite him and other gang members naming Cooke as the perpetrator, as fellow paedophiles are not considered reliable witnesses in a court of law. Despite this, Bailey's trial was highly unusual in that it explicitly named Cooke and another man, Lennie Smith, as the killers, despite them having not been charged. Cooke's role in the murder was not fully investigated until 1999, after Cooke's release from prison; by this time, Bailey had been murdered in prison in October 1993. Cooke has indicated he knows where Tildesley's body is buried but refuses to disclose the exact location.

Murder of Barry Lewis
Cooke is also suspected of involvement in the murder of another boy, six-year-old Barry Lewis, for which Bailey was convicted in June 1991. Lewis had been snatched from the street while playing with friends in Walworth, South London, on 15 September 1985. His body was found in Essex in April 1986, only four days from the discovery of Swift's body.

In 1990, Bailey confessed to police that Cooke's gang had abducted, drugged and raped Lewis before Bailey had been tasked with disposing of the body the next day. Bailey told police detailed information about the murder which confirmed his testimony as genuine, and led police to the location of Lewis's grave. As with Tildesley, Bailey implicated Cooke in Lewis's murder. Although he was the only one convicted in the murders of Lewis and Tildesley, police believed Cooke was the leader of the gang.

Operation Orchid
While in prison, Cooke reportedly boasted of his ring killing "about fifteen" children to cellmates. Members of the ring also reportedly made references to killing Lewis, whose murder was at this point still unsolved but which detectives on the Swift enquiry were already aware of. One prisoner, Ian Gabb, felt so disgusted by the confessions that he volunteered to give information to the authorities. Police set up Operation Orchid to further investigate murders that could be linked to the ring.

Gabb informed police that a ring member named Lennie Smith had been involved in the group's murders along with Cooke. Police subsequently put Smith under surveillance, and he was soon arrested for indecent assault on a child in a public toilet. Gabb also provided detectives with maps he had drawn based on the descriptions of where the ring members claimed they had buried their victims, to which police responded by searching several sites of interest. Operation Orchid officers eventually solved the then unsolved murders of Tildesley and Lewis after Bailey formally confessed. Gabb volunteered to remain in prison longer than his own sentence to continue assisting the police, and was later rewarded by being given a reduced sentence.

Appeal and parole
Cooke's sentence for the manslaughter of Swift was reduced to sixteen years on appeal in 1989, and he was paroled nine years later in April 1998. He told an appeals court that Bailey was the ringleader of the gang. Cooke's parole caused huge public outrage, which was exacerbated by a plan to move him to a hostel near two schools and the fact that Cooke himself admitted that he might re-offend if he was released. While in prison, Cooke refused to take part in any rehabilitation sessions. Police refused to disclose the location to which he was to be moved, smuggling him out of prison to avoid a vigil for his victims. For the next nine months, Cooke lived in a suite of cells at Yeovil police station at his own request, rarely venturing out in public.

1970s offences, re-arrest
Following an investigation by the Channel 4 documentary programme Dispatches on 29 October 1998, Thames Valley Police reopened investigations concerning alleged sex offences by Cooke. He was arrested on 26 January 1999. Three days later, Cooke was charged at Reading police station with committing eighteen sex offences which occurred between 1972 and 1981 in South London, Berkshire, Kent, Tyne and Wear and Hertfordshire; he was moved back to prison on remand. Many of the offences had come to public attention after they were disclosed in the Channel 4 documentary.

At his trial at Manchester Crown Court on 5 October 1999, Cooke pleaded guilty to all but eight of the charges, which were four counts of rape, three counts of indecent assault, and one of buggery that occurred in 1981. These were abandoned by the judge, who ordered them to lie on file. Following Cooke's sentencing, NSPCC director Jim Harding said:

On 17 December 1999, at Wolverhampton Crown Court, Cooke received two life sentences, and Judge David Poole told Cooke that he would only be considered for release after he had served a minimum of five years in prison and if the parole board was satisfied he was not a danger to the public.

Aftermath
Since his five-year minimum prison sentence expired in January 2004, Cooke has been turned down for parole ten separate times. He was denied parole most recently in October 2021, aged 94, on the grounds that his behaviour whilst imprisoned "had been mixed and had provoked concerns and even allegations over the years".

Investigations into other possible victims
Roger Stoodley, who retired as the detective leading the Cooke investigation in 1992, stated in 2014 that the unsolved disappearances and murders of two other boys, Vishal Mehrotra and Martin Allen, were in keeping with the Cooke gang's modus operandi. The gang were known to have abducted boys who they found walking on their own.

Disappearance of Martin Allen

On 5 November 1979, 15-year-old Martin Allen travelled home from school on the London Underground. His intention was to go to see his older brother, Bob, who lived near Holloway Road, but he needed to go home first in order to collect some money. At around 3:50 pm, he said goodbye to some school friends at King's Cross station and set off in the direction of the Piccadilly line platform to travel home. This was the last confirmed sighting of Allen.

After a televised appeal five weeks after Allen's disappearance, a male witness came forward to report seeing a man accompanying a boy acting suspiciously at Gloucester Road station at 4:15 pm, about half an hour after Martin vanished. The witness reported that the man was standing with his arm around the shoulder of the boy, who resembled Allen. The boy appeared distressed and both parties appeared to be nervous as they got onto a train. The witness saw the man prod the boy in the back, and overheard him telling the boy not to try to run when the pair left the train at Earl's Court station. The witness described the man as six feet tall, in his thirties, well built, with very blonde hair and a moustache, and wearing a denim jacket and trousers.

In 2012, police initiated a number of new investigations into child abuse allegations dating back over the previous thirty years. This included a re-investigation of claims of systemic child abuse by an alleged pedophile ring at Elm Guest House during the 1970s and 1980s. The location of Elm Guest House, along with the alleged activities of the individuals involved there, have led to media speculation that Allen was abused and murdered by paedophiles operating there. In May 2016, Operation Malswick superseded Operation Midland and was formed specifically to re-investigate Allen's case. Police questioned Cooke.

Death of Vishal Mehrotra

On 29 July 1981, the day of the wedding of Prince Charles and Lady Diana Spencer, 8-year-old Vishal Mehrotra's family took the train into London in order to watch the wedding. They then took the train back to East Putney, where they arrived around 1:40 pm. Vishal said he was tired and wanted to walk home by himself which he was allowed to do considering he was independent enough to make the journey. He was taken across the main road pedestrian crossing and then left to walk the rest of the way. Vishal's parents reported him missing at 7 pm to the Metropolitan Police.

On 25 February 1982, two men who were shooting pigeons discovered a skull, seven ribs and some vertebrae at Alder Copse, Durleigh Marsh Farm, Rogate, near Petersfield. The bones appeared to have been disturbed by foxes and were found buried in a bog at a depth of around two feet. Following the discovery, a large scale excavation and search involving about thirty police officers took place. This uncovered more bones, though no clothing was found. The bones were taken to London for forensic investigation. Initially, police believed that the body had been buried around 29 July 1981.

In the late 1980s, a Metropolitan Police unit that had been investigating  Cooke's infamous "Dirty Dozen" paedophile ring began to investigate whether Mehrotra could have been another of the gang's victims. The gang was known to have killed at least three similarly aged boys after abducting them in London in the 1980s, and always abducted them in broad daylight like in Mehrotra's case. It also appeared from Mehrotra's remains that he had been buried naked, indicating a sexual element to the killing. The "Dirty Dozen" investigative team held a meeting with Sussex Police at the time but no concrete evidence was found to link the enquiries.

In March 2015, the BBC reported that the Metropolitan Police had referred itself to the Independent Police Complaints Commission following allegations of corruption in relation to the case. Subsequently, in May 2015, Sussex Police released documents relating to a review of the murder they had carried out in 2005. The force's report on the case revealed that other police forces had in fact investigated links between Mehrotra's death and Cooke's gang on three occasions. The report also revealed that the Metropolitan Police's paedophile unit had concluded there were "strong similarities" between Mehrota's case and the gang's known killings. It is known that some members of the gang had boasted in prison of killing an 'Asian boy', and it was reported in 2015 that investigators were looking into whether this could have been Mehrotra.

A few months after his son's disappearance, Mehrotra's father claimed to have been contacted by an unidentified man thought to be in his twenties. This man suggested that Vishal's abduction had been connected to a group of influential paedophiles associated with Elm Guest House. The man stated that he had informed the Metropolitan Police but they had not followed up his report. Mehrotra's father gave a recording of the telephone conversation to detectives; however, they dismissed it as a prank call and it was not followed up on. The location of Vishal's disappearance was less than a mile from Elm Guest House.

Documentaries
Cooke and his paedophile ring were the subject of two Crimewatch File documentaries titled "The Lost Boys", which were shown on 4 October and 11 October 1994 respectively. The first documentary focused on the conviction of Cooke and the ring for the killing of Jason Swift, while the second focused on the continuing investigations into the ring's role in the murders of Mark Tildesley and Barry Lewis and Bailey's conviction for them.

See also
Child sexual abuse in the United Kingdom
Ronald Jebson, a British serial killer and fellow paedophile who committed the infamous 1970 Babes in the Wood murders, known to have had a close friendship with Cooke
List of serial rapists
List of serial killers by number of victims
Notable inmates in HM Prison Wakefield

References

External links
Cooke: The predatory paedophile from BBC News
Protests and riots over Cooke from BBC News

Further reading

1927 births
20th-century English criminals
Criminals from Gloucestershire
English male criminals
English people convicted of child sexual abuse
English people convicted of indecent assault
English people convicted of manslaughter
English prisoners sentenced to life imprisonment
English rapists
Living people
Prisoners sentenced to life imprisonment by England and Wales
Suspected serial killers
Torture in England
Violence against children in England
Violence against men in the United Kingdom